The Dubai Sevens is played annually as part of the IRB Sevens World Series for international rugby sevens (seven-a-side version of rugby union). The 2009 competition was held on December 4 and December 5 at The Sevens.
It is the first of eight events in the 2009–10 IRB Sevens World Series.  New Zealand won the tournament with a 24–12 victory over Samoa in the final.

This was the second edition of the Dubai Sevens to be held at The Sevens. Previous editions were held at the Dubai Exiles Rugby Ground.

Format
The tournament consists of four round-robin pools of four teams. All sixteen teams progress to the knockout stage. The top two teams from each group progress to quarter-finals in the main competition, with the winners of those quarter-finals competing in cup semi-finals and the losers competing in plate semi-finals. The bottom two teams from each group progress to quarter-finals in the consolation competition, with the winners of those quarter-finals competing in bowl semi-finals and the losers competing in shield semi-finals.

Teams

Pool stages

Pool A
{| class="wikitable" style="text-align: center;"
|-
!width="200"|Team
!width="40"|Pld
!width="40"|W
!width="40"|D
!width="40"|L
!width="40"|PF
!width="40"|PA
!width="40"|+/-
!width="40"|Pts
|- 
|align=left| 
|3||3||0||0||93||21||72||9
|- 
|align=left| 
|3||2||0||1||61||43||18||7
|-
|align=left| 
|3||1||0||2||71||42||29||5
|-
|align=left| 
|3||0||0||3||14||133||-119||3
|}

Pool B
{| class="wikitable" style="text-align: center;"
|-
!width="200"|Team
!width="40"|Pld
!width="40"|W
!width="40"|D
!width="40"|L
!width="40"|PF
!width="40"|PA
!width="40"|+/-
!width="40"|Pts
|- 
|align=left| 
|3||2||1||0||88||24||64||8
|- 
|align=left| 
|3||2||1||0||90||38||52||8
|-
|align=left| 
|3||0||1||2||36||88||-52||4
|-
|align=left| 
|3||0||1||2||36||100||-64||4
|}

Pool C
{| class="wikitable" style="text-align: center;"
|-
!width="200"|Team
!width="40"|Pld
!width="40"|W
!width="40"|D
!width="40"|L
!width="40"|PF
!width="40"|PA
!width="40"|+/-
!width="40"|Pts
|- 
|align=left| 
|3||3||0||0||95||22||73||9
|- 
|align=left| 
|3||2||0||1||67||58||9||7
|-
|align=left| 
|3||1||0||2||19||66||-47||5
|-
|align=left| 
|3||0||0||3||50||85||-35||3
|}

Pool D
{| class="wikitable" style="text-align: center;"
|-
!width="200"|Team
!width="40"|Pld
!width="40"|W
!width="40"|D
!width="40"|L
!width="40"|PF
!width="40"|PA
!width="40"|+/-
!width="40"|Pts
|- 
|align=left| 
|3||3||0||0||105||20||85||9
|- 
|align=left| 
|3||2||0||1||72||57||15||7
|-
|align=left| 
|3||1||0||0||31||88||-57||5
|-
|align=left| 
|3||0||0||3||36||79||-43||3
|}

Knockout

Shield

Bowl

Plate

Cup

Statistics

Individual points

Individual tries

Notes and references

External links
 IRB Sevens
 Dubai Sevens on irb.com

2009
2009–10 IRB Sevens World Series
2009 in Emirati sport
2009 in Asian rugby union